Amana is a small genus of flowering bulbs in the lily family, closely related to tulips and included in Tulipa by some authors. Amana is found in China, Japan and Korea.   the World Checklist of Selected Plant Families recognizes four species, three of which were formerly placed in the genus Tulipa:

References

Bibliography 

 
 
 

Liliaceae
Liliaceae genera
Flora of China
Flora of Eastern Asia